Jason Watkins (June 23, 1972) is a registered Lobbyist in the State of Kansas representing the Chamber of Commerce for Wichita, Kansas.  He resigned his position representing the 105th Kansas District during the middle of his third term in December 2009.

Watkins was a Republican member of the Kansas House of Representatives, representing the 105th district.  He served from 2005 to 2009.

Committee membership
 Appropriations (Vice-Chair)
 General Government Budget (Chair)
 Judiciary

Major donors
The top 5 donors to Watkin's 2008 campaign:
1. Kansas Assoc of Realtors 	$1,000 	
2. Kansas Bankers Assoc 	$1,000 	
3. Associated General Contractors 	$800 	
4. Kansas Medical Society 	$750 	
5. Kansas Livestock Assoc 	$750

References

External links
 Official website
 Kansas Legislature - Jason Watkins
 Project Vote Smart profile
 Kansas Votes profile
 State Surge - Legislative and voting track record
 Campaign contributions: 2008

Republican Party members of the Kansas House of Representatives
Living people
1972 births
21st-century American politicians